Judge Whelan may refer to:

Francis C. Whelan (1907–1991), judge of the United States District Courts for the Central and Southern Districts of California
Máire Whelan (born 1956), judge of the Court of Appeal of Ireland
Thomas J. Whelan (judge) (born 1940), judge of the United States District Court for the Southern District of California